The Erinville Hospital was one of the three maternity hospitals in Cork, Ireland. It was located on the Western Road in the city.

History
The hospital was initially established at Hanover Street on 10 March 1799. It moved to Dyke Parade in the mid-1820s. Its final location was a property which had been built for the Perrot Family in Western Road in 1861; the hospital acquired the property and moved there in 1898. After services transferred to the Cork University Maternity Hospital, Erinville Hospital, along with the St. Finbarr's Maternity Hospital and the Bon Secour Maternity Hospital, closed on 31 March 2007.

References

Hospitals in County Cork
Defunct hospitals in the Republic of Ireland
2007 disestablishments in Ireland
Buildings and structures in Cork (city)
1861 establishments in Ireland
Hospitals established in 1861
Hospitals disestablished in 2007